Police Now is a British charity supporting the recruitment of police officers across England & Wales. The social enterprise works with 31 of 43 police forces.

History
Police Now was initially set up as a graduate scheme by former Detective Chief Inspector David Spencer and Detective Superintendent Tor Garnett at the Metropolitan Police Service. Following its incubation within the Metropolitan Police, Police Now became an independent charitable social enterprise in April 2016. The scheme was inspired by Teach First, the educational initiative that recruits graduates into schools.

Activities
Police Now recruit graduates into policing across England and Wales. The charity delivers two programme recruiting future Neighbourhood Police Officers and direct entry Detectives.

Police Now is known for its focus on recruiting a diverse range of people into policing with a particular focus on recruiting Black, Asian and minority ethnic people. The social enterprise believes the wider policing sector can do more to advance diversity and inclusion. Police forces in the UK often come under scrutiny for their lack of diversity. During a recruitment campaign arguing that police forces needed to reflect the communities they serve, Lord Woolley, a trustee of the charity, claimed the lack of diversity in UK police forces could be attributed to stop and search and criminalisation of young black men for minor offences.

Governance
Police Now's board of trustees is chaired by Sir Ian Powell. The organisation is a registered charity, and a registered company limited by guarantee.

The charity has appointed a number of notable trustees 
 Helen Ball , Assistant Commissioner of the Metropolitan Police
 Louisa Rolfe , Assistant Commissioner of the Metropolitan Police
 Lord Woodley , Political activist and politician
 James Bowler , Senior Civil Servant 
 Rhammel Afflick , Political activist 
 Judith Clegg, Entrepreneur and author

References

Charities based in the United Kingdom
Law enforcement in the United Kingdom
2015 establishments in the United Kingdom